Distrigaz Sud is a major player on the Romanian natural gas market being responsible for distributing gas in the southern part of Romania.

Oil and gas companies of Romania
Engie